Batrachedra microtoma is a species of moth of the family Batrachedridae. It is found in Australia from southern Queensland to central New South Wales.

Adults are small and grey. They have a few fine dark sports or markings on their forewings.

External links
Australian Faunal Directory

Batrachedridae
Moths of Australia
Moths described in 1897